The Waxhaw massacre, (also known as the Waxhaws, Battle of Waxhaw, and Buford's massacre) took place during the American Revolutionary War on May 29, 1780, near Lancaster, South Carolina, between a Continental Army force led by Abraham Buford and a mainly Loyalist force led by British officer Banastre Tarleton. Buford refused an initial demand to surrender, but when his men were attacked by Tarleton's cavalry, many threw down their arms to surrender. Buford apparently attempted to surrender. However, the British commanding officer Tarleton was shot at during the truce, causing his horse to fall and trap him. Loyalists and British troops were outraged at the breaking of the truce in this manner and proceeded to fall on the Americans.

While Tarleton was trapped under his dead horse, the British continued killing the Continental soldiers, including soldiers who were not resisting. The British gave little quarter to the rebels. Of the 400 or so Continentals, 113 were killed with sabers, 150 so badly injured they could not be moved, and the British and Loyalists took 53 prisoners. "Tarleton's quarter" thereafter meant refusing to take prisoners. In subsequent battles in the Carolinas, it became rare for either side to take significant prisoners. The Battle of Waxhaws became the subject of an intensive propaganda campaign by the Continental Army to bolster recruitment and incite resentment against the British. After Lord Cornwallis surrendered at Yorktown, the only British officer not invited to dine with General Washington was Tarleton.

Background

Following the British defeat at Saratoga in 1777 and French entry into the American Revolutionary War in early 1778, the British military decided to embark on a "southern strategy" to win back their rebellious colonies. The British believed they had more supporters in the South due to the close business and trading relationships, and that they might concentrate power in the South and later retake the North. They began the campaign in December 1778 with the capture of Savannah, Georgia. In 1780, General Sir Henry Clinton brought an army south and captured Charleston, South Carolina on May 12, 1780, after a siege.

Prelude
Colonel Abraham Buford commanded a force of about 380 Virginian Continentals (the 3rd Virginia Detachment, composed of the 7th Virginia Regiment, two companies of the 2nd Virginia Regiment and an artillery detachment with two six-pounders). Most of his men were raw recruits with little battle experience, although Buford had experienced officers under his command. Because of delays in outfitting his command, Buford had been unable to reach Charleston and participate in its defense. Charleston's commander, General Benjamin Lincoln, had ordered him to take a defensive position near Lenud's Ferry on the Santee River outside the city, but Lincoln surrendered around the time Buford reached this position. Buford was eventually joined by about 40 Virginia Light Dragoons who had escaped the siege or during battles outside the city, and by Richard Caswell's North Carolina militia. Receiving news of the surrender, Buford was ordered by General Isaac Huger to return to Hillsborough, North Carolina. He turned his column around and headed north.

At Camden, Buford and Caswell parted ways, with Buford marching north into the Waxhaws region. Buford was accompanied for a time by South Carolina Governor John Rutledge, who had been actively recruiting militia in the backcountry. When Buford stopped to rest his troops at Waxhaw Creek, Rutledge rode ahead toward Charlotte, North Carolina.

General Clinton learned of Huger's and Rutledge's forces and on May 15 ordered Lord Cornwallis to bring the South Carolina and Georgia backcountry under British control. His army moving too slowly to keep up with Buford, Cornwallis on May 27 sent Lieutenant Colonel Banastre Tarleton in pursuit with a force of about 270 men. Tarleton commanded the British Legion, a primarily Loyalist provincial regiment. The force he took in pursuit of Buford consisted of 170 Legion and British Army dragoons, 100 mounted British Legion infantry, and a three-pounder cannon.

Tarleton reached Camden late on May 28, and set off in pursuit of Buford around midnight early the next day. By that afternoon, his advance force of 60 dragoons from the 17th Light Dragoons and the British Legion cavalry, 60 mounted infantry from the British Legion, and an additional flanking force of 30 British Legion dragoons and some infantry, had reached Buford's resting place. Warned of Tarleton's pursuit, Buford had begun moving north, and was  up the road.

Battle
Tarleton sent Captain David Kinlock forward to the rebel column, carrying a white flag, to demand Buford's surrender. Upon his arrival, Buford halted his march and formed a battle line while the parley took place. Tarleton greatly exaggerated the size of his force in his message—claiming he had 700 men—hoping to sway Buford's decision. The note also said, "Resistance being vain, to prevent the effusion of human blood, I make offers which can never be repeated", indicating that Tarleton would ask only once for Buford to surrender. Buford refused to surrender, responding: "I reject your proposals, and shall defend myself to the last extremity." Buford reformed his troops into a column, and continued the northward march, with his baggage train near the front of the column. Tarleton, in violation of accepted rules of war, had continued his march while the parley took place.

Around 3:00 pm the leading edge of Tarleton's force caught up with Buford's rear guard. According to a Patriot eyewitness, a field surgeon named Robert Brownfield, the five dragoons of the rear guard were captured, and their leader, Captain Pearson, was "inhumanely mangled" by saber cuts, some inflicted after he had fallen. Buford stopped the column (except for the artillery and the baggage, which he ordered to continue on), and formed a single battle line near some open woods. Tarleton, some of whose horses were so tired from the pursuit that he was unable to bring his field artillery into range, established a command post on a nearby hill, and organized his forces for the attack. According to his account of the battle, he arrayed 60 British Legion dragoons and a like number of infantry on the right, the dragoons of the 17th along with some additional British Legion dragoons in the center, and he personally took command of the left, commanding "thirty chosen horse and some infantry". Stragglers were to form a reserve corps atop the hill.

What happened next is the subject of much debate; there are significant inconsistencies in the primary accounts. Tarleton's line charged, and Buford waited until the enemy was within  before giving the order to fire. This was a tactical mistake on Buford's part, for it enabled Tarleton's formations to hold, while giving Buford's men time to fire only a single volley before the British riders were attacking the line. As Tarleton's cavalry tore Buford's line to pieces, many of the Americans began laying down their arms and offering to surrender. According to Patriot accounts, Buford, realizing the cause was lost, dispatched a white flag toward Tarleton in an attempt to surrender (exactly when differs among the accounts). However, Tarleton was trapped beneath his dead horse, following the mount being shot from under him during the surrender, and may never have received it. Although Patriot accounts say that a surrender flag was sent, they differ both on who carried it, and how its messenger was treated. Loyalists and British troops were incensed at the betrayal and fighting continued on both sides despite the white flag being visible. The conflicting Patriot accounts agree that flag was effectively refused. None of the British accounts of the battle mention the surrender flag. Buford and some of his cavalry were able to escape the battlefield.

According to Tarleton's report of the battle, the American rebel casualties were 113 men killed, 147 wounded and released on parole, and 2 six pounders and 26 wagons captured. The British losses were 5 killed, 12 wounded, with 11 horses killed and 19 horses wounded. Tarleton's men had also recovered the American baggage train.

Historians in the 19th century blamed Tarleton for the massacre, but most contemporary references to it do not describe it as such. Tarleton, in a version published in 1781, said that the battle was a "slaughter"; he said that his horse had been shot from under him during the initial charge and his men, thinking him dead, engaged in "a vindictive asperity not easily restrained". William Moultrie noted that the lopsided casualty count was not unusual for similar battles in which one side gained a decided advantage early in a battle. Historian Jim Piecuch argues that the battle was no more a massacre than similar events led by Patriot commanders. David Wilson, on the other hand, holds Tarleton responsible for the slaughter. He notes that it represented a loss of discipline, something for which Tarleton was accountable. He had already been reprimanded for transgressions by his men at the Battle of Monck's Corner in April. Charles Stedman, a Cornwallis aide, wrote of British actions at Waxhaws that "the virtue of humanity was totally forgot."

Aftermath

After the battle, the wounded were treated at nearby churches by the congregants, one of whom was a young Andrew Jackson. Tarleton reported that after the battle ended, the wounded of both sides were treated "with equal humanity" and that the British provided "every possible convenience". Due to the large number of wounded, people from all over the countryside came to assist in their care. When they learned of what had happened, albeit one-sidedly, news of the apparent violation of quarter on Tarleton's part spread rapidly through the region.

The battle, at least temporarily, consolidated British control over South Carolina, and Patriot sentiment was at a low ebb. General Clinton, among other acts before he left Charleston for New York, revoked the parole of surrendered Patriots. This affront (violating accepted "rules of war"), and reports of this battle, may have changed the direction of the war in the South. Many who might have stayed neutral flocked to the Patriots, and "Tarleton's Quarter!" and "Remember Buford" became rallying cries for the Whigs.

News of the massacre directly inspired the creation of volunteer militia forces among the over-mountain men (from the Wataugan settlements at, and near Sycamore Shoals). These militia participated in actions against British Loyalists at both the Battle of Musgrove Mill on August 18, 1780, (near present-day Clinton, South Carolina) and in the decisive defeat of British Major Patrick Ferguson's command on October 7, 1780, at Kings Mountain (near present-day Blacksburg, South Carolina).

Legacy
The community in which the battlefield is located is now called Buford, and the nearby high school is named Buford High School, after Colonel Buford.  The battlefield is owned by Lancaster County, and is preserved as a local park.  In 1990 it was listed on the National Register of Historic Places as Buford's Massacre Site. The American Battlefield Trust and its partners have acquired and preserved  of the battlefield.

See also
 American Revolutionary War § War in the South. Places ' Battle of Waxhaws ' in overall sequence and strategic context.

Notes

References

External links

1780 in the United States
1780 in South Carolina
Conflicts in 1780
Waxhaws
Waxhaws
Waxhaws
Waxhaws
Lancaster County, South Carolina
South Carolina in the American Revolution
Massacres in 1780
Massacres committed by Great Britain
Massacres in the American Revolutionary War